Black Hand was a type of Italian extortion racket. Originally developed in the eighteenth century, Black Hand extortion came to the United States in the later nineteenth century with immigrants.

Black Hand was a method of extortion practiced by gangsters of the Camorra and the Mafia. American newspapers in the first half of the twentieth century sometimes made reference to an organized "Black Hand Society", a criminal enterprise composed of Italians, mainly Sicilian immigrants. However, many Sicilians disputed its existence and objected to the associated negative ethnic stereotype, but this was not the only viewpoint among Italian-Americans. Il Telegrafo: The Evening Telegraph, a newspaper for the Italian American community in New York City, printed an editorial on March 13, 1909 in response to Joseph Petrosino's assassination, which read in part, "The assassination of Petrosino is an evil day for the Italians of America, and none of us can any longer deny that there is a Black Hand Society in the United States."

Origin
The roots of the Black Hand can be traced to the Kingdom of Naples as early as the 1750s. The English language term specifically refers to the organization established by Italian immigrants in the United States during the 1880s. Some of the immigrants formed criminal syndicates, living alongside each other and largely victimizing fellow immigrants.

By 1900, Black Hand operations were firmly established in the Italian communities of major cities, including Philadelphia, Chicago, New Orleans, Scranton, San Francisco, New York, Boston, and Detroit. In 1907, a Black Hand headquarters was discovered in Hillsville, Pennsylvania, a village located a few miles west of New Castle, Pennsylvania. The Black Hand in Hillsville established a school to train members in the use of the stiletto. Another Black Hand headquarters was later discovered in Boston, Massachusetts. This headquarters, managed by Antonio Mirabito, allegedly operated from New England to as far south as New York City. Police were hopeful that Mirabito's arrest would assist in ending the practice of Black Hand, but it continued in the area for about another decade. More successful immigrants were usually targeted, although as many as 90% of Italian immigrants and workmen in New York and other communities were threatened with extortion.

Typical Black Hand tactics involved sending a letter to a victim threatening bodily harm, kidnapping, arson, or murder. The letter demanded a specified amount of money to be delivered to a specific place. It was decorated with threatening symbols such as a smoking gun, hangman's noose, skull, or knife dripping with blood or piercing a human heart, and was frequently signed with a hand, "held up in the universal gesture of warning", imprinted or drawn in thick black ink.

Author Mike Dash states "it was this last feature that inspired a journalist writing for The New York Herald to refer to the communications as 'Black Hand' letters — a name that stuck, and indeed, soon became synonymous with crime in Little Italy." The term "Black Hand" was readily adopted by the American press and generalized to the idea of an organized criminal conspiracy, which came to be known as "The Black Hand Society."

Tenor Enrico Caruso received a Black Hand letter on which were drawn a black hand and dagger, demanding $2,000. He decided to pay, "and, when this fact became public knowledge, was rewarded for his capitulation with 'a stack of threatening letters a foot high,' including another from the same gang for $15,000." He reported the incident to the police who arranged for him to drop off the money at a prearranged spot, then arrested two Italian businessmen who retrieved the money.

On occasion, criminals used violence against law enforcement officials who battled Black Hand schemes. Victims of assassinations linked to Black Hand operations include New Orleans Police Department chief David Hennessy and New York Police Department lieutenant Joseph Petrosino.

See also
 Black Hand (Chicago)

References

Further reading

 (An excellent social historical study of the Black Hand during the early years of the twentieth century—when the influx of Italians was the greatest—using a variety of print sources.)

External links
The Black Hand, article by Jon Black at GangRule.com
The Black Hand, organized Crime in Queensland, Australia. 

American Mafia
Camorra
History of the Sicilian Mafia
Secret societies related to organized crime
Italian-American history